{{Infobox election
| election_name     = 2004 United States Senate election in Oregon
| country           = Oregon
| type              = presidential
| ongoing           = no
| previous_election = 1998 United States Senate election in Oregon
| previous_year     = 1998
| next_election     = 2010 United States Senate election in Oregon
| next_year         = 2010
| election_date     = November 2, 2004

| image1            = 
| nominee1          = Ron Wyden
| party1            = Democratic Party (United States)
| popular_vote1     = 1,128,728
| percentage1       = 63.4%

| image2            = 
| nominee2          = Al King
| party2            = Republican Party (United States)
| popular_vote2     = 565,254
| percentage2       = 31.8%

| map_image         = OR 2004 US Senate.svg
| map_size          = 250px
| map_caption       = County results Wyden:     King:   
| title             = U.S. Senator
| before_election   = Ron Wyden
| before_party      = Democratic Party (United States)
| after_election    = Ron Wyden
| after_party       = Democratic Party (United States)
}}

The 2004 United States Senate election in Oregon was held on November 2, 2004. Incumbent Democratic U.S. Senator Ron Wyden won re-election to a second full term. As of 2022, this is the most recent United States Senate election in Oregon in which any Eastern Oregon counties voted for a Democratic nominee, and it is Oregon’s most recent senatorial election in which the winning candidate carried the majority of the state’s counties.

 Major candidates 
 Democratic 
 Ron Wyden, incumbent U.S. Senator since 1996

 Republican 
 Al King, rancher

 General election 
 Predictions 

 Polling 

 Results 

 
 

|-
| 
| colspan=5 |Democrat hold'''

|-

See also 
 2004 United States Senate elections

References 

Senate
Oregon
2004